Émile Allegret (24 April 1907 – 22 November 1990) was a French soldier and member of the French Resistance during World War II.

Biography 

After secondary school, he joined the French Air Force in 1926 for five years. A non-commissioned officer, he followed the course for élève aspirant (training student) (EOR). He then graduated from the École nationale de l'aviation civile (French civil aviation university) and became an engineer and test pilot. A reserve officer, he was staying at Royan as a flight instructor when war was declared in September 1939. He heard the appeal of 18 June 1940 and, after the second Armistice at Compiègne, refused to fly for the German air force. Émile Allegret quickly joined the French Resistance. Obliged to conceal his identity, he became an agent of the resistance movement Organisation civile et militaire. After joining the  6th arrondissement of Paris, he carried out information missions on the Atlantic coast and in particular at Royan, where he revealed the location of fortifications and coastal defense batteries. He succeeded in a mission to avoid weapons and ammunition stored in the basement of the City Hall of Royan. Hunted by the Gestapo, he had to leave France and succeeded, 24 December 1942, in joining Spain by crossing the Pyrenees.

He enlisted in the Free French Forces 25 January 1943 at the French mission at Gibraltar. Arriving in London, he was incorporated in the Free French Forces 13 February 1943, and on 5 March 1943 he joined the Bombardment Group "Lorraine", called "Squadron 342". He flew against German anti-aircraft 23 December 1943, and again 5 and 9 February 1944. During this time, in January 1944, the lieutenant Allegret took command of the squadron "Metz" and multiplied the bombing operations. Then, he participated in the historic mission of protection, smoke screening troops for Normandy landings on the Normandy coast 6 June 1944. He was seriously injured on duty, 27 January 1945. He ended the war with the rank of Captain, carrying out 55 bombings in total with "Lorraine", including several skim bombings.

After the war, Émile Allegret started a career as an air navigation engineer. He joined the Secrétariat général de l'aviation civile (civil aviation department) in 1961  as an air navigation division engineer. He became head of the Toulouse-Blagnac Airport. He last job was head assistant at the Nice Côte d'Azur Airport before retiring in May 1968.

Émile Allegret died 22 November 1990 (83 years old) at Vaux-sur-Mer.

Honours 

 Commandeur of the Légion d'honneur
 Companion of the Liberation - Decree of 8 May 1945
 Croix de guerre 1939–1945
 Médaille de la Résistance
 Croix du combattant volontaire de la Résistance
 Médaille des Évadés
 Médaille de l'Aéronautique
 Médaille commémorative des services volontaires dans la France libre
 Distinguished Flying Cross
 Service militaire volontaire argent
 Médaille de la France libérée
 European African middle eastern campaign medal

Bibliography 

 Académie nationale de l'air et de l'espace and Lucien Robineau, Les français du ciel, dictionnaire historique, Le Cherche midi, June 2005, 782 p., p. 29, ALLÉGRET, Émile

External links 

 Biography on the Ordre de la Libération website

References 

École nationale de l'aviation civile alumni
Aviation in France
Commandeurs of the Légion d'honneur
Recipients of the Aeronautical Medal
Recipients of the Resistance Medal
French aerospace engineers
1907 births
1990 deaths
Companions of the Liberation
French Air Force personnel of World War II
French World War II pilots
Space program of France
Free French military personnel of World War II